The decade of the 2020s will see only the Delta IV Heavy remain in operation following the retirement of the Delta II in 2018 and single-stick (non-Heavy) variants of the Delta IV in 2019. This will mark the final decade for the Thor-Delta rocket family as ULA's upcoming Vulcan Centaur rocket is set to replace the Delta IV Heavy in the mid-2020s.

Launch statistics

Launch sites

Launch outcomes

Launch history

See also 

 List of Atlas launches (2020–2029)
 List of USA satellites
 List of NRO launches

References 

Lists of Thor and Delta launches
Lists of Delta launches